Princes Park is a small public park and Site of Local Importance for Nature Conservation in Temple Fortune in the London Borough of Barnet.

History
Princes Park was laid out as a public park in 1923.  The area was shown as wooded on a 1796 map, and it has mature oak trees that predate local housing. A wild service-tree and crab apple also show a long history, while hawthorn hedges are probably remnants of farm hedgerows.

Amenities
It has two tennis courts and a children's playground.

There is access from Oakfields Road and Park Way.

In February 2018 a memorial for Sir Nicholas Winton was installed.

See also

 Nature reserves in Barnet
 Barnet parks and open spaces

External links 

 Princes Park, London Gardens Online
 Princes Park, London Fun for Kids

References

Further reading

Nature reserves in the London Borough of Barnet
Parks and open spaces in the London Borough of Barnet